The following lists events that happened during 1815 in Australia.

Incumbents
Monarch - George III

Governors
Governors of the Australian colonies:
Governor of New South Wales – Lachlan Macquarie
Lieutenant-Governor of Van Diemen's Land – Major Thomas Davey

Events
 14 January – The road over the Blue Mountains is completed to the Macquarie River.
 7 April – Bathurst, New South Wales is founded following its discovery by George Evans.
 1 May – The Supreme Court opens and William Broughton and Alexander Riley are appointed as its first judges.
 25 May – George William Evans discovers the Lachlan River.
 12 December – Captain James Kelly sets out on circumnavigation of Tasmania, during which important observations are made on the resources of the west coast.
 A single ship carries 60,000 sealskins to London from Australia (a normal cargo contains at least 10,000 skins).

Births
27 May – Henry Parkes
5 August – Edward John Eyre
7 September – John McDouall Stuart

Deaths
9 January – Augustus Alt
10 November – Ellis Bent
11 November – Maurice Margarot

References

 
Australia
Years of the 19th century in Australia